Stephen Amis (born 21 November 1966) is an Australian film and television screenwriter, film director and film producer, known mostly for his independent sci-fi, action and fantasy-themed films.

Personal life 
Stephen Amis was born in Melbourne, Victoria, Australia, and graduated from the Swinburne Film & Television School in 1989.
Stephen went on to produce and direct the 16mm short, Virus (2005)  - a steam-punk science fiction fantasy, set at the Melbourne Astronomical Observatory in 1888. The film featured state of the art CGI special effects, and starred Kerry Armstrong and John Stanton.

Career 
His first feature film, See Jack Run, won the 1994 Australian Children's Film Festival.  He is set to direct Defend - Conserve - Protect, a documentary centered on the work of Sea Shepherd Conservation Society, featuring actor Dan Aykroyd. In 2012 he wrote, produced and directed the WWII sci-fi adventure The 25th Reich. In 2018, he wrote and directed the film The BBQ.

Awards 
He won the 1986 Victorian Young Achiever's Award and two Australian Cinematographer's Awards.

References

External links 
 

1966 births
Living people
Australian film directors